The men's discus throw at the 2006 European Athletics Championships were held at the Ullevi on August 10 and August 12.

Medalists

Schedule

Results

Qualification
Qualification: Qualifying Performance 63.50 (Q) or at least 12 best performers (q) advance to the final.

Final

External links
Results
 Results European Championships Athletic 1934-2010 

Discus throw
Discus throw at the European Athletics Championships